The 2022 Melon Music Awards was held on November 26, 2022, at the Gocheok Sky Dome in Seoul, South Korea. Organized by Kakao M through its online music store Melon, the 2022 ceremony was the fourteenth installment of the event and its first fully offline ceremony since 2019. Artists who released music between November 8, 2021, and November 3, 2022, are eligible for the awards.

Lim Young-woong won two daesangs—Artist of the Year and Album of the Year, while Ive won the Song of the Year (daesang). BTS were awarded Record of the Year (daesang) while Ive and NewJeans won Best New Artist, with the latter marking the first time two female acts won in the category during the same ceremony.

Judging criteria

Voting
Voting for categories opened for South Korean residents on the Melon Music website on November 4 and will continue until November 18, 2022. Only artists who released music between November 8, 2021, and November 3, 2022, are eligible. The longlist of nominees was selected based on the chart performance criteria (60% downloads and 40% streams) for each artist combined with weekly Melon Popularity Award votes achieved during the eligibility period. Categories that are open to online voting include: Top 10 Artists, Album of the Year, Song of the Year, Best New Artist, Best Male Solo, Best Female Solo, Best Male Group, Best Female Group, and Netizen Popularity Award.

Performers

Presenters

 Kim Hyang-gi – Top 10 Artist Award
 Jonathan Thona and Patricia Thona – Best Performance
 Song Ye-rin – 2022 Choice
 Bae Hyun-sung and Park Ji-hu – Best Songwriter & Best Music Style
 Leo J – Global Artist & Global Rising Artist
 Lee Sun-bin – Top 10 Artist Award
 Haha and Shin Hyun-ji – Best Male – Solo & Best Group – Female
 Jasson and Hong Hyun-hee – Netizen Choice & Best Music Video
 Go Min-si – Top 10 Artist Award
 Moon Sang-min and Yang Hye-ji – 1theK Global Icon & Hot Trend
 Chung Sung-hwa – Best New Artist
 Ahn Hyo-seop and Kim Se-jeong – Best OST & Best Collaboration
 Lee Soo-hyuk – Album of the Year & Record of the Year
 Cha Seung-won – Best Song of the Year & Artist of the Year

Winners and nominees
Nominations were announced via the Melon website on November 4, 2022. Winners are listed first and highlighted in bold.

Other awards

Notes

References

Melon Music Awards ceremonies
2022 in South Korean music
2022 music awards
Annual events in South Korea
November 2022 events in South Korea